Jordan McGregor (born 18 March 1997) is a Scottish professional footballer who plays as a central defender for Stirling Albion. He has previously played for Hibernian, Hamilton Academical and Airdrieonians, as well as Berwick Rangers on loan.

Career
After beginning his career with Hibernian, McGregor moved on loan to Berwick Rangers in January 2016. He signed for Hamilton Academical in July 2016. He made his debut for Hamilton in a 3–0 victory against St Mirren in the League Cup on 23 July 2016, alongside fellow debutantes Massimo Donati and Jack Breslin.

McGregor joined Airdrieonians in January 2017 on a loan deal until the end of the season.

In March 2017, McGregor signed a contract extension with Hamilton until May 2018.

On 17 August 2017, it was announced that McGregor would re-join Airdrie on loan for the first half of the season, alongside Hamilton teammate Ryan Tierney. At the completion of his loan deal, McGregor signed a contract with Airdrieonians until the end of the season.

On 31 August 2018, McGregor signed for Aberdeen reserves after impressing on trial. He joined Stirling Albion
in January 2019.

Career statistics

References

1997 births
Living people
Scottish footballers
Hibernian F.C. players
Berwick Rangers F.C. players
Hamilton Academical F.C. players
Airdrieonians F.C. players
Scottish Professional Football League players
Association football defenders
Aberdeen F.C. players
Stirling Albion F.C. players